The Courtroom is a British legal drama created by Phil Redmond, which aired between June and December 2004. Music was composed and performed by Steve Wright.

The programme was notable for starring many former British soap stars, particularly those who starred in Redmond's other productions Brookside and Hollyoaks.

References

External links 
 

Channel 4 television dramas
2004 British television series debuts
2004 British television series endings
2000s British drama television series
2000s British legal television series
English-language television shows